The Panama City  shootings occurred on December 14, 2010, in Panama City, Florida. In the attack, a disgruntled individual, Clay Allen Duke, fired four shots at six Bay District School board members, but missed them all, including the superintendent. Duke was then shot several times by Head of Safety and Security Mike Jones, a retired police officer, before committing suicide.

Much of the episode and its immediate aftermath were recorded by local television news stations WMBB and WJHG-TV. The video was subsequently uploaded to video sharing sites, including YouTube.

Incident

At 2:00 p.m. on December 14, 2010, Duke stood up during a school board meeting in Panama City, Florida, and said, "I have a motion." He then promptly pulled out a can of red spray paint and sprayed a "V" inside a circle, as seen in the graphic novel V for Vendetta and film V for Vendetta. He then drew a 9mm Smith & Wesson 469 semiautomatic pistol, causing other staff near the bench and audience members to duck for cover. He aimed the gun at the board members and used it to point to two women, saying, "You may leave, and you may leave...the women can leave...The six men stay, everyone else leave."

After the room was evacuated, Duke told the board members he was upset that his wife had been fired from her job as an English teacher in the Panama City district. The superintendent, Bill Husfelt, after an approximately four-minute discussion, tried to negotiate with Duke, saying, "I'm the only one who signs [the papers], will you let them [the other board members] go?" Duke denied his requests to allow the other board members to leave, saying, "They're part of it."

Husfelt then argued with Duke about his threat, saying, "For what? [Referring to Duke's threat to kill himself] This isn't worth it." Duke raised the pistol and leveled it at the superintendent. Husfelt started to hold his arms to his chest, saying, "Please don't, please don't, please..." Duke fired, hitting the table in front of Husfelt, who dropped to the floor. The board members dived to the ground behind the desk. Duke then fired a second shot into the floor of the room, saying "I'm going to kill you", just as a responding security guard, Mike Jones, opened fire on Duke. After being hit by one of Jones' rounds, Duke fired two or three more times behind the table. Despite four or five shots being fired from Duke's gun, no board members were hit. He was shot again by Jones and fell to the ground. Duke blindly fired six more shots at Jones, then pointed the gun at his head and died by suicide. Jones was not injured, but was taken to the hospital for chest pains. According to his wife, Duke was an excellent marksman and likely missed his targets intentionally. Jones later stated, "I thought I'd let them down. I opened the door with one hand and was firing with the other. ...I don't know how I survived with all those shots fired." He also added, "I'm not a hero, folks."

Minutes after the shooting, WMBB uploaded the video to YouTube and other sites, where it received more than 1,000,000 views in less than a week.

Hostage-taker

Clay Allen Duke (November 24, 1954 – December 14, 2010) was a 56-year-old unemployed Floridian who was apparently disgruntled over the firing of his wife by the school board. He was described by the Associated Press as a "troubled, broke ex-con with bipolar disorder, an interest in anarchy, a wife whose unemployment benefits had run out and frustrations that reached their boiling point on a day circled on his calendar at home". Duke had previously been convicted of aggravated stalking and attempted ambush with a rifle in 1999 and 2000, respectively. While in prison, he was diagnosed with bipolar disorder but was unable to afford treatment after his release. Although Duke was sentenced to five years in prison in 2000, he was released in January 2004, at which point he became a licensed massage therapist, according to state records.

Duke was reportedly unhappy with the school board for terminating his wife's teaching job in the Panama City district. In addition, Duke felt a particular sales tax was unfair because it hurt lower-income families more than the wealthy.  Prior to the shooting, Duke spray-painted a red circle with a 'V' inside it—an allusion to the film, V for Vendetta.

Duke posted to his Facebook page a week before the shootings:

Duke was noted several times as saying that he planned to die in the shooting.

Ginger Littleton
Duke removed the gun from his pocket and told everyone in the room to leave, aside from the male board members seated at the elevated podium. On her way out, board member Ginger Littleton turned back into the room and attempted to disarm Duke by whacking his pistol with her purse. The attempt failed and Littleton was knocked to the floor; Duke did not shoot, instead simply threatening her inaudibly (Littleton later said that he called her a "stupid bitch" ), and making her leave the room at gunpoint.

A week after the shootings, the purse that Littleton used to hit Duke sold on the online auction site eBay for $13,000, with the proceeds going to charity.

References

External links
Video interview with superintendent Bill Husfelt the morning after the attack

2010 active shooter incidents in the United States
December 2010 crimes in the United States
Suicides by firearm in Florida
Panama City, Florida
Hostage taking in the United States
2010 in Florida
Filmed suicides
Crimes in Florida
Attacks in the United States in 2010